June Gable (born June 5, 1945) is an American character actress, perhaps best known for her role as Joey's agent Estelle Leonard in the NBC sitcom Friends. She also played a Nurse in the delivery room in season 1 episode 23 “The One With The Birth.” She received a Tony Award nomination for her work on Broadway.

Life and career
Gable studied acting at Carnegie Mellon University in Pittsburgh.

Gable has appeared in four Broadway productions including the 1974 revival of Candide for which she was nominated for a Tony Award for Best Featured Actress in a Musical for her portrayal of the Old Lady.  She was featured as Snooks Keene in the infamous Broadway disaster, Moose Murders, which opened and closed on the same night in 1983. She also appeared in a replacement cast of the off-Broadway revue Jacques Brel is Alive and Well and Living in Paris.

On television, Gable played Detective Battista on the third season of Barney Miller. She was also in the cast of the short-lived 1977 revival of Rowan & Martin's Laugh-In.  In 1979 she appeared as "Rhoda Rooter" on the live-action Hanna-Barbera TV specials Legends of the Superheroes. From 1978 to 1981 she was regular cast member on the syndicated variety series Sha Na Na. In the 1980s she guest starred on popular series including Miami Vice and Kate & Allie, and had small parts in the films Brenda Starr and She-Devil (both 1989). She also appeared in a recurring role in the HBO comedy series Dream On from 1990 to 1996 playing Libby Friedman.

From 1994 to 2004, Gable played Estelle Leonard, the agent of Matt LeBlanc‘s character Joey Tribbiani, on the NBC sitcom Friends. Her character died in 2004 during the show's tenth and final season. She played a nurse on the same show in season 1, episode 23. After Friends, Gable retired from acting. She told Wealthsimple : "As soon as Friends ended, I retired. The man I loved was very ill and I wanted to be able to take care of him". In later years, she performed in productions of The Odd Couple, Picon Pie, and Broads!. In November 2012, she starred in the lead role of Marie in the world premiere of Bill C. Davis' "All Hallowed" at the Waco Civic Theatre in Waco, Texas under the direction of George Boyd.

In 2018, Gable made her first screen appearance in more than 15 years, appearing in the Netflix comedy film The Week Of. In 2022, she starred as Ray Romano's character's mother in the comedy-drama film, Somewhere in Queens.

Filmography

Film

Television

Theatre

References

External links

Living people
Actresses from New York City
American stage actresses
American film actresses
American television actresses
20th-century American actresses
21st-century American actresses
Year of birth missing (living people)